North Macedonia elects on the national level a head of state—the president—and a legislature. The president is elected for a five-year term by the people. The Assembly of the Republic of North Macedonia (Sobranie) has 120-123 members, elected for a four-year term, by proportional representation. 
North Macedonia has a multi-party system, with numerous parties in which no one party often has a chance of gaining power alone, and parties must work with each other to form coalition governments.

Last elections

Parliamentary elections were held on 15 July 2020.

Presidential elections were held in April and May, 2019.

Presidential
On 21 April 2019, the first round of the presidential elections resulted voters turnout receiving 41.67% of the vote. this round didn't receive 50% of all registered voters, and so a second round was held on 5 May 2019. In first round resulted , The SDSM Stevo Pendarovski won 44.75% of the votes and VMRO-DPMNE Gordana Siljanovska-Davkova, won 44.16% of the votes and then the second round resulted, Stevo Pendarovski won 53.58% of the votes was the main contestant win for the post, and Gordana Siljanovska-Davkova won 46.42% of the votes,

Parliamentary
The Parliamentary election took place on 15 July 2020. The incumbent ruling party, SDSM with coalition partner Lëvizja Besa is the second largest Albanian party, got 35.89% of the votes and won 46 of the 120 seats in the Sobranie. The VMRO-DPMNE, won 34.57% of the votes and won 44 seats, the DUI, which is the largest Albanian party, receiving 11.48% of the votes and won 15 seats, and the Alliance for Albanians–Alternative is the third largest Albanian party, receiving 8.95% of the votes and won 12 seats.

Ethnic groups
Following Macedonian independence in 1991, politics in the country are split along ethnic lines with Albanians voting for Albanian parties and Macedonians voting for Macedonian parties. In this context elections have come to reflect the censuses. Ethnic groups in the country view a change in the demographic composition of an administrative unit of government as resulting in a change of a mayor's ethnic affiliation that would implement the choices and priorities of their community.

Notes

References

External links
Macedonia Elections - Full Data
Adam Carr's Election Archive
Parties and elections
ODIHR reports on the elections in North Macedonia
CIVIL - Center for Freedom, human rights organization and elections observers
MOST, elections watchdog